The 1947 Victorian Football Association season was the 66th season of the Australian rules football competition. The premiership was won by the Port Melbourne Football Club, which defeated Sandringham by 31 points in the Grand Final on 4 October. It was the sixth premiership in the club's history.

Premiership 
The home-and-home season was played over twenty-two matches, before the top four clubs contested a finals series under the Page–McIntyre system to determine the premiers for the season.

Ladder

Finals

Awards 
 The leading goalkicker for the season was Bill Findlay (Port Melbourne), who kicked 100 goals in the home-and-home season and 107 goals overall. Douglas (Brighton) finished level with Findlay on 100 goals after the home-and-home season, but did not participate in finals.
 The J. J. Liston Trophy was won by Stan Tomlins (Sandringham), who polled 48 votes. Cec Hiscox (Northcote) was second with 39 votes and J. Turner (Brighton) was third with 35 votes.
 Coburg won the seconds premiership. Coburg 11.13 (79) defeated Prahran 9.15 (69) in the Grand Final, played as a curtain raiser to the firsts Grand Final on 4 October.

Notable events 
 Mr Henry Zwar, MLA resigned from his position as president of the Association, which he had held since May 1944. At the annual general meeting in February 1947, former Oakleigh president Mr Squire Reid, MLA was elected as his replacement; he served in the role until his death in July 1949.
 The Association introduced a free kick for "kicking in danger" – that is, kicking recklessly at the ball where there is a strong risk of kicking an opposing player in the process, even if no contact is made with the opposing player. No such provision existed under ANFC rules until at least a decade later.
 On Monday 16 June (King's Birthday holiday), a combined Association team played against a combined Bendigo Football Association team – which was bolstered by some Association players to make for a more even contest – at Golden Square Oval in Bendigo. Bendigo 19.7 (131) defeated the Association 17.5 (107).
 For the second consecutive season, Sandringham overcame a large three-quarter time deficit to beat Williamstown in the preliminary final. Sandringham 9.13 (67) trailed Williamstown 14.14 (98) at three-quarter time, before kicking seven goals to two in the final quarter to win by three points, 16.21 (117) d. 16.18 (114). In the corresponding game in 1946, Williamstown had led by 40 points at three-quarter time.

External links 
 List of VFA/VFL Premiers

References 

Victorian Football League seasons
VFL